Awaous guamensis is a species of goby native to the Pacific islands from the Marianas to Vanuatu, New Caledonia and Fiji where it can be found in fresh, brackish and marine waters.  Recent work based upon morphological and genetic differences has recognized Hawaiian populations of Awaous as being distinct from Awaous guamensis. Consequently, Hawaiian Awaous are now recognized as a distinct species Awaous stamineus.

Description
Males can reach a length of  SL while females only reach . The body has white streaks with speckles and a dark olive color.

Ecology
The species is found in slow-moving waters especially on Kaua‘i during their annual spawning run to the stream mouth. ‘O‘opu nakea can swim upstream between 10 to 200 feet in strong currents. They are omnivores, and their diet in one study was found to consist of 84% filamentous algae and 16% of chironomids (non-biting midges) and other animal food.

Eggs are laid downstream where the males and females guard the nest. The males make the nest and attract the females who then lay one clutch per year.

Human use
‘O‘opu nakea are eaten cooked; a common way of preparation is by salting them for 12 hours, then wrapping them in ti leaves and placing them on hot coals.

References

External links 
 Photograph

guamensis
Fish of the Pacific Ocean
Freshwater fish of Oceania
Fish described in 1837
Taxa named by Achille Valenciennes